General Hayrullah Fişek (1885–1975) was a career officer in the Turkish army (Captain, Ottoman War Academy, 1904 - rtd. 1945, Major-General (Mirliva) Undersecretary for the Ministry of National Defence).

Life

Hayrullah Fişek, born in Kalkandelen (now Tetovo, North Macedonia), was a senior officer in the Turkish army. Hayrullah was given the name Fişek, meaning cartridge in Turkish. Hayrullah Fişek was a direct descendant of Süleyman Aga "Fişekçi" (born around 1775 in Kalkandelen), the founder of the Fişek family.

His parents were Hafiz Süleyman Efendi (1849 Kalkandelen – 1894 Balıkesir), a Land Registry Officer and Fatma Hanko (1847 Kalkandelen –1930 Istanbul), Sheikh Mustafa Ruhi Efendi's daughter. He was of Albanian descent.

Military career

He entered Military Academy in 1901. He completed the Military Academy as the seventh of the class in 1904 (1320-P.7) and joined the Ottoman military as an Infantry Second Lieutenant (Mülazım-ı Sani). In 1906, he entered the Staff College and he graduated as a Distinguished Captain (Mümtaz Yüzbaşı).

During the Turkish Independence War, he participated in the Battle of Sakarya as the chief of staff of the Provisional Corps (Mürettep Kolordu) and he served as the chief of staff of XIV Corps, Kocaeli Group, III Corps with the rank of staff lieutenant colonel. He also participated in battle at Balıkesir, Soma and Bandırma. He retired in 1946.

Family

He had one sister named Hatice (1873–1902) and 3 brothers : Abdülhâmit Bey (1866–1917), a Finance officer, Nuri Bey (1878–1945), and Zekeriya Bey (1880–1932), both officers of the Turkish Army.

Hayrullah married Mukaddes Fişek (1891–1958) and they had two sons: Nusret Fişek M.D. (1914–1990), Undersecretary, Ministry of Health and Hicri Fişek (1918–2002), Professor of International Law.

Photos

References

External links 
 Hayrullah Fisek Family Web Site
 Fisek Institute
 Biography of (in Turkish)

1885 births
1975 deaths
People from Tetovo
Ottoman Military Academy alumni
Ottoman Military College alumni
Ottoman Army officers
Ottoman military personnel of World War I
Recipients of the Order of the Medjidie
Turkish military personnel of the Greco-Turkish War (1919–1922)
Recipients of the Medal of Independence with Red Ribbon (Turkey)
Turkish Army generals
Turkish people of Albanian descent
Macedonian Turks